Tuzly Lagoons are a group of marine lagoons (limans) in southern Bessarabia (Budjak), Ukraine. The lagoons are part of the Tuzly Lagoons National Nature Park, proclaimed on January 1, 2010.

The group includes three main lagoons: Shahany, Alibey, and Burnas, and also smaller lagoons: Solone Ozero, Khadzhyder, Karachaus, Budury, Kurudiol, Martaza, Mahala, Malyi Sasyk, and Dzhantshey.

The total area of the lagoons is 206 km2, depth 1.6–2.5 m, averaging 1.0–1.3 m. The lagoons are separated from the Black Sea by a 29-km long sandbar, which is 60–400 m wide and 1–3 m high.

Notes and references 

 
Saline lakes of Europe
Lagoons of Ukraine
Ramsar sites in Ukraine
Landforms of Odesa Oblast
Budjak